The 2010 Manitoba Lotteries Women's Curling Classic was held October 22–25, 2010 in Winnipeg, Manitoba. It was the second Grand Slam event of the 2010-11 curling season. The total purse was $C60,000. $15,000 went to the winning Chelsea Carey rink who defeated Cathy Overton-Clapham in the final. Carey's team thus qualifies to play in the 2010 Canada Cup of Curling

Teams

Results

A Event

B Event

C Event

Playoffs

External links
WCT Event site

Manitoba Lotteries Women's Curling Classic, 2010
2010 in Canadian curling
Curling competitions in Winnipeg